The 2022 Internazionali di Tennis Città di Todi was a professional tennis tournament played on clay courts. It was the 16th edition of the tournament which was part of the 2022 ATP Challenger Tour. It took place in Todi, Italy between 4 and 10 July 2022.

Singles main-draw entrants

Seeds

 1 Rankings are as of 27 June 2022.

Other entrants
The following players received wildcards into the singles main draw:
  Mattia Bellucci
  Matteo Gigante
  Francesco Passaro

The following player received entry into the singles main draw as a special exempt:
  Juan Bautista Torres

The following player received entry into the singles main draw as an alternate:
  Jelle Sels

The following players received entry from the qualifying draw:
  Rémy Bertola
  Andrey Chepelev
  Joris De Loore
  Giovanni Fonio
  Billy Harris
  Francesco Maestrelli

Champions

Singles

 Pedro Cachín def.  Nicolás Kicker 6–4, 6–4.

Doubles

 Guido Andreozzi /  Guillermo Durán def.  Romain Arneodo /  Jonathan Eysseric 6–1, 2–6, [10–6].

References

Internazionali di Tennis Città di Todi
2022
2022 in Italian tennis
July 2022 sports events in Italy